Bùi Ngọc Long (born 6 October 2001) is a Vietnamese footballer who plays for V.League 1 side Ho Chi Minh City.

Career statistics

Club

Notes

References

2001 births
Living people
Vietnamese footballers
Association football midfielders
V.League 1 players
Viettel FC players
Than Quang Ninh FC players
Saigon FC players
Azul Claro Numazu players
Vietnamese expatriate footballers
Vietnamese expatriate sportspeople in Japan
Expatriate footballers in Japan